WLLF (96.7 MHz) is a commercial FM radio station in Mercer, Pennsylvania, and serving the Youngstown metropolitan area.  It has a sports radio format, much of it simulcast with co-owned WBBW 1240 AM, from the CBS Radio Network. It is one of seven radio stations in the Youngstown market owned by Cumulus Broadcasting.

The studios and offices are in "The Radio Center" in Hermitage, Pennsylvania.  WLLF carries a variety of local high school and college sports as well as games from the Pittsburgh Pirates baseball team, the Cleveland Browns football team and the Pittsburgh Penguins hockey team.

History
The station was first issued a construction permit in March 1984.  It signed on in January 1985 as WKTX.  It was purchased in August 1990 by Mercer County Broadcasting, headed by Patrick Engrao.  For a time, this station was the co-owned sister station of WKTX AM 830 in Cortland, Ohio.

The WLLF call letters originated in 1991, when the station simulcast Youngstown rock station WNCD "The Wolf", then at 106.1 MHz.  The call letters have remained on the station since, including when it was a Smooth Jazz outlet.

In April 2010, Cumulus ended the station's long run as "96.7 The River", a satellite-fed adult contemporary format, and launched a new sports format featuring ESPN Radio with the Pittsburgh Pirates and Pittsburgh Penguins radio networks.  The station also carries a local sports show originating at sister station WPIC 790 AM in Sharon, Pennsylvania.  WLLF also carries a variety of local high school and college sports.

On January 2, 2013, WLLF switched its network to CBS Sports Radio, ending its affiliation with ESPN Radio.

External links

LLF
Radio stations established in 1985
CBS Sports Radio stations
Cumulus Media radio stations
1985 establishments in Pennsylvania
LLF